Ahad Koruna is a town in the Federally Administered Tribal Areas of Pakistan. It is located at 34°23'13N 71°15'5E with an altitude of 843 metres (2769 feet).

References

Populated places in Khyber Pakhtunkhwa